Lawrencetown is a village within Annapolis County in the Annapolis Valley of Nova Scotia, Canada. The town was first settled in 1760 and named after Nova Scotia governor Charles Lawrence.  the population was 636, an increase of 23.3% over the previous five years.

Lawrencetown is home to Lawrencetown Consolidated School for grades P-5, and the Centre of Geographic Sciences (COGS), a branch of the Nova Scotia Community College.

The Annapolis Valley Exhibition has been held annually since 1927 at the Lawrencetown Exhibition Grounds and is a week long agricultural event.  In 2010, Lawrencetown was nominated as one of the top 12 towns for Kraft Hockeyville, representing eastern Canada in the wildcard category. On March 27, 2010, it was revealed on CBC Hockey Night In Canada that they were voted into the top five towns.

Demographics 

References

External links
Village of Lawrencetown

Communities in Annapolis County, Nova Scotia
Villages in Nova Scotia
Designated places in Nova Scotia
General Service Areas in Nova Scotia